Karen Morton may refer to:

 Karen Morton (model), Playboy's Miss July 1978
 Karen Morton (sport shooter), British sport shooter